Colin Davidson may refer to:

Colin Davidson (Australian Army officer) (1902–1979), land surveyor and Australian Army officer awarded the US Medal of Freedom
Colin Davidson (cyclist) (born 1969), Canadian cyclist
Colin Davidson (artist) (born 1968), Irish visual artist